Marguerite Island is a rocky island  northwest of Empereur Island and  north-northwest of Cape Margerie, Antarctica. It was charted in 1951 by the French Antarctic Expedition and named by them for Marguerite, a character in Goethe's Faust.

See also 
 List of Antarctic and sub-Antarctic islands

References

Islands of Adélie Land